James Alexander (1769 – 12 September 1848) was an Irish-born officer of the British East India Company who sat in the House of Commons of the United Kingdom in two periods from 1812 to 1832.

Born in County Londonderry, Alexander joined the East India Company in 1784, and later became  a partner in a merchant bank in Calcutta.  His time in India gained him huge wealth.

He returned to the United Kingdom in 1818, and bought an estate in Hampshire. In 1820, he and his brother, Josias, jointly purchased the rotten borough of Old Sarum from their cousin, the 2nd Earl of Caledon, who had been arranging the return of James to Parliament since 1812, having previously arranged the return of another brother, Henry Alexander.

References 
 

1769 births
1848 deaths
People from County Londonderry
British East India Company Army officers
British bankers
Members of the Parliament of the United Kingdom for English constituencies
UK MPs 1807–1812
UK MPs 1812–1818
UK MPs 1818–1820
UK MPs 1820–1826
UK MPs 1826–1830
UK MPs 1830–1831
UK MPs 1831–1832